Isolation is the debut studio album by American singer Kali Uchis, released worldwide on April 6, 2018, by Rinse Recordings, Virgin EMI Records, and Universal Music Group. The album was supported by five singles: "Dead to Me", "Tyrant" featuring Jorja Smith, "Nuestro Planeta" featuring Reykon, "After the Storm" featuring Tyler, the Creator and Bootsy Collins, and "Just a Stranger" featuring Steve Lacy. The album was later certified Gold by the Recording Industry Association of America.

Recording
In June 2018, Kali was concerned for her debut album's sound:

Music and lyrics
In an interview with NPR, Kali Uchis spoke on the details of her relationship with her family and growing up alongside the lyrics of "Killer", stating:

"After the Storm" features vocals from rapper Tyler, the Creator and singer Bootsy Collins. "Nuestro Planeta" features vocals from reggaeton performer Reykon. The song is a progressive R&B and Latin pop song with a reggaeton rush, and serves as the second single for Isolation. The silky funk song serves as the third single of the album. The A.V. Club describes "Body Language" as a "Smoke-ring bossa nova" song. "Miami" is a progressive Latin pop and R&B song.

Release and promotion

Uchis supported the album with her 23-date North American "In Your Dreams" tour which commenced on September 13, 2018, in Seattle and ended on November 10, 2018, in Los Angeles. Gabriel Garzón-Montano and Cuco served as opening acts for the tour.

Uchis made her television debut on The Tonight Show alongside Tyler, the Creator to perform "After the Storm".

Critical reception

Isolation received widespread acclaim from critics. At Metacritic, which assigns a normalized rating out of 100 to reviews from mainstream publications, the album received an average score of 87, based on 17 reviews. Ilana Kaplan of The Independent wrote that Uchis "has been largely underrated the past few years, but Isolation might just finally give her the attention she deserves". In a rave review for Paste, Madison Desler stated that "for an album that's fifteen tracks to be this consistently good is ... an artistic triumph that should place it on every Best Of list at the end of the year", concluding the album "perhaps signal[s] a legend in the making." Q critic Rupert Howe praised Uchis' "natural pop charisma and ... ability to glide effortlessly between genres". For Rolling Stone, Joe Levy praised the album as "fascinating" and simultaneously "vintage and futuristic", comparing it to the works of Beck and Outkast. In a five-star review Thomas Smith of NME commented that "miraculously, [the album] feels in no way forced: it's a joy to witness her glide into any genre and totally own it". For Exclaim!, A. Harmony scored the album an eight out of ten and wrote the album "bends genres to her will rather than allowing them to absorb her identity, making for an impressive effort that will only improve as it ages."

For Pitchfork, Julianne Escobedo Shepherd wrote that Isolation "positions her to become a new gravitational force in pop". Pitchfork also included the album at number 38 on its list of 50 best albums of 2018, with Daphne Carr writing that it "pays tribute to pop's past while making it sound new through glowing homage to black and Latinx jukebox favorites and a global roster of collaborations housed in classic soul/R&B aesthetics."

Accolades

Track listing
Credits adapted from album's liner notes.

Notes
  signifies a vocal producer.
 "Nuestro Planeta" translates to "Our Planet"

Sample credits
 "Gotta Get Up" contains elements of "Love in Triplicate", performed by Midas Touch.
 "After the Storm" contains an element of "Wesley's Theory", performed by Kendrick Lamar, George Clinton, and Thundercat.

Personnel
Credits adapted from album's liner notes.

Musicians

 Thundercat – bass, guitar, drums 
 David Andrew Sitek – guitar, bass 
 DJ Dahi – keyboards, programming 
 Tommy Brenneck – guitar 
 Wayne Gordon – guitar, glockenspiel ; string arrangement 
 Nick Movshon – bass 
 Victor Axelrod – piano 
 Dave Guy – trumpet 
 Neal Sugarman – tenor saxophone 
 Cochemea Gastelum – baritone saxophone 
 Coco Taguchi – violin 
 Garo Yellin – cello 
 Homer Steinweiss – drums 
 Bosco Mann – string arrangement 
 Asa Davis – keyboards, bass 
 Kevin Arcilla – electric guitar, bass 
 TJ Osinulu – drums 
 Sounwave – keyboards , drums , programming 
 Larrance Dopson – keyboards, programming 
 Jairus Mozee – guitar 
 Two Inch Punch – bass, keyboards, drums, percussion, programming 
 John Foyle – synthesizers, guitars, programming 
 The Rude Boyz – keyboards, programming 
 Damon Albarn – vocals, keyboards, guitar, bass, programming, drums, percussion 
 Jeff Gitty – guitar 
 Josh Crocker – programming , guitar, bass, keyboards, drums, percussion 
 Kevin Parker – guitar, bass, keyboards, programming, drums, percussion 
 Greg Kurstin – synthesizers, piano, Moog, Rhodes 
 Chester Hansen – synthesizers, bass 
 Matthew Tavares – Rhodes 
 Leland Whitty – guitars 
 Alexander Sowinski – drums, percussion 
 Simon Guzman – conga 

Technical

 Keith Parry – recording 
 Kyle VandeKerkhoff – recording 
 Wayne Gordon – recording 
 Simon Guzman – recording 
 Eric Stenman – recording 
 James Musshorn – recording 
 Matthew Emonson – recording 
 Todd Bergman – recording 
 Two Inch Punch – recording, mixing 
 Mavig – recording, mixing 
 Vic Wainstein – recording 
 Brandon Kelly – recording , engineering assistance 
 Jeff Ellis – mixing 
 Tony Maserati – mixing 
 John Foyle – mixing 
 Timothy Nguyen – mix assistance 
 Chico Torres – mix assistance 
 Josh Crocker – mix assistance 
 Dave Kutch – mastering

Charts

Certifications

References

2018 debut albums
Albums produced by Kevin Parker
Albums produced by Thundercat (musician)
Albums produced by Steve Lacy
Albums produced by Sounwave
Albums produced by BadBadNotGood
Alternative R&B albums
Bossa nova albums
Funk albums by American artists
Hip hop albums by American artists
Hip hop albums by Colombian artists
Kali Uchis albums
Neo soul albums
Universal Music Group albums
Virgin Records albums
Albums produced by Two Inch Punch